"Take Me Away" is a song by Italian group Cappella. It samples American singer Loleatta Holloway's 1980 track, "Love Sensation", and was released in 1992 via various European labels, as a single only. A big hit in clubs, it reached the top 30 in both the UK and Ireland, where it peaked at number 25 and number 17, respectively.

Critical reception
Larry Flick from Billboard described the song as "a technotinged hi-NRG rave", adding, "The Italo-producer/DJ interweaves her vocals into a spiraling arrangement of synths that are alternately rough and disco-smooth. Break out the platform boots for this one, kids!" James Hamilton from Music Weeks RM Dance Update noted that Holloway's acappella of 'Love Sensation' "once again provides the vocal samples for an italo house pounder, this consequently old fashioned but powerful urgent galloper". David Quantick from New Musical Express commented, "Cappella — who did that fine "Helyob Halim" record about a hundred years ago — return with a more Techno sort of job which nicks all the RUNK RUNK RUNK bits off other records and adds little else. Very fast though". Sian Pattenden from Smash Hits wrote, "This record is more stormin' than a hurricane and has whirlwinds of plinkety plonky syntherisms to boot. It bounces along delightfully. Hurrah! Runner-up Single Of The Fortnight."

Track listing
 12" single, UK (1992)   
"Take Me Away" (Extended Mix) – 6:19
"Take Me Away" (Techno Mix) – 6:09                

 CD single, UK (1992)   
"Take Me Away" (Edit) – 3:44
"Take Me Away" (Extended Mix) – 6:19
"Take Me Away" (Techno Mix) – 6:09              

 CD maxi, Japan (1992)'   
"Take Me Away" (Extended Mix)
"Take Me Away" (Techno Mix)
"Everybody" (Techno Mix)
"Everybody" (Soul Mix)             
"Everybody" (Techno House Remix)

Official mixes and remixes
 “Take Me Away” (Edit) 3:44
 “Take Me Away” (Radio Edit) 4:23
 “Take Me Away” (Extended Mix) 6:19
 “Take Me Away” (Techno Edit) 3:41
 “Take Me Away” (Techno Mix) 6:09

Charts

References

 

1992 singles
Cappella (band) songs
Electronic songs
1992 songs
Songs written by Gianfranco Bortolotti